Porta Nuova is a Turin Metro station, located inside Porta Nuova railway station, near Piazza Carlo Felice. It was part of the Line 1 extension from XVIII Dicembre to Porta Nuova opened on 5 October 2007. On 6 March 2011 the line was extended to Lingotto.

Services
 Connections with urban and suburban bus lines
 Ticket vending machines
 Handicap accessibility
 Elevators
 Escalators
 Active CCTV surveillance

References

Turin Metro stations
Railway stations opened in 2007
2007 establishments in Italy
Railway stations in Italy opened in the 21st century